The 1994 Campeonato Brasileiro Série A was the 38th edition of the Campeonato Brasileiro Série A.

Overview
The Palmeiras won the championship. Relegated: Remo and Nautico.

First stage

Group A

Group B

Group C

Group D

Second stage

First round

Group E

Group F

Second round

Group E

Group F

Second stage overall

Relegation league

Final standings

Final stage

*Corinthians qualified due to better record.

Final

Top scorers

References

1994
1